Orthoprosopa grisea is a species of hoverfly in the family Syrphidae.

Distribution
Australia.

References

Eristalinae
Insects described in 1835
Diptera of Australasia
Taxa named by Francis Walker (entomologist)